Featherstone Bridge is a stone arch bridge across the River South Tyne at Featherstone in Northumberland.

History
This structure is a stone arch bridge completed in 1775. It is a Grade II* listed structure. There is a plaque above the keystone on inner face of the west parapet displaying the name of the bridge.

References

Bridges in Northumberland
Crossings of the River Tyne
Grade II* listed buildings in Northumberland